Hell's Kitty is a 2018 American comedy horror film based on a web series and a comic book of the same name, which aired during 2011-2015. The web series is said to be based on the true life events of the writer, director, Nicholas Tana's real-life experiences living with his strange cat, Angel. Hell's Kitty makes its musical theater debut at the Hollywood Fringe Festival in June 2019. The musical features the American Tracks award winning song Chainsaw Kitty.

Plot 
Nick, a Hollywood writer, and Angel, his possessed and very possessive cat live together. Nick's cat Angel behaves possessively of his owner around women, which results in some comical yet horrific situations.

Cast 

Nicholas Tana as Nick
Doug Jones as Father Damien
 Dale Midkiff as Rosemary Carrie
 Adrienne Barbeau as Mrs. Carrie
 Lee Meriwether as Grandma Kyle
 Michael Berryman as Detective Pluto
 Courtney Gains as Mordicia
John Franklin as Isaiah
 Lynn Lowry as The Medium
Kelli Maroney as Esmerelda
Ashley C. Williams as Lyndsay
Barbara Nedeljakova as Natalya
Bill Oberst Jr. as Father Blatty

References

External links 

 
Hell's Kitty - Comic Book

2010s English-language films